Srinivas Fadte (born 10 October 1993) is an Indian cricketer. He made his first-class debut for Goa in the 2016–17 Ranji Trophy on 7 December 2016. He made his List A debut for Goa in the 2017–18 Vijay Hazare Trophy on 6 February 2018.

References

External links
 

1993 births
Living people
Indian cricketers
Goa cricketers
Place of birth missing (living people)